Pelobatrachus is a genus of frogs in the family Megophryidae. It was formerly synonymized with Megophrys until 2021, when it was revived as a distinct genus. They inhabit Southeast Asia, namely the Malay Peninsula, Sumatra, Borneo and the Philippines. Their common name is clay horned toads.

Taxonomy 
The following species are recognized in the genus Pelobatrachus:

 Pelobatrachus baluensis  — Kinabalu horned frog
 Pelobatrachus edwardinae  — Edwardine's horned toad
 Pelobatrachus kalimantanensis  — Kalimantan horned frog
 Pelobatrachus kobayashii  — Kobayashi's horned frog
 Pelobatrachus ligayae  — Palawan horned frog
 Pelobatrachus nasutus  — long-nosed horned frog or Malayan horned frog
 Pelobatrachus stejnegeri  — Mindanao horned frog

References 

Pelobatrachus
Megophryidae
Amphibian genera
Amphibians of Asia